The island of Martinique is an overseas department of France located in the Caribbean Lesser Antilles.

Amphibians
There are five species of amphibian on Martinique, three of which were introduced.  One species, the Martinique volcano frog (Colostethus chalcopis), is endemic to Martinique.

Frogs (Anura)

Reptiles
Including marine turtles and introduced species, there are 19 reptile species reported on Martinique, five of which are endemic.

Crocodilians (Crocodylia)

Turtles (Testudines)

Lizards and snakes (Squamata)

Notes

References 
Note: All species listed above are supported by Malhotra & Thorpe 1999, unless otherwise cited.

.
.

 Amphibians
Martinique
 Martinique
 Martinique
Martinique
Martinique